Furui (written: 古井) is a Japanese surname. Notable people with the surname include:

, Japanese music arranger and keyboardist
, Japanese writer and translator

Japanese-language surnames